Ugo Fangareggi (30 January 1938 – 20 October 2017) was an Italian actor.

Life and career
Born  in Genoa, Fangareggi worked as a dental technician when in 1961 he was noticed by Luigi Squarzina who chose him to act in the play Ciascuno a suo modo.

He later moved to Rome to devote himself to a professional acting career and in a short time he became one of the most active character actors in Italian cinema. Mainly devoted to humorous roles, he is best known for the role of Mangold in Mario Monicelli's The Incredible Army of Brancaleone. Fangareggi was also active in several successful TV series.

On 20 October 2017, Fangareggi died in Rome after a lengthy battle with Parkinson's disease, aged 79.

References

External links 

1938 births
2017 deaths
Actors from Genoa
Italian male stage actors
Italian male film actors
Italian male television actors
Neurological disease deaths in Lazio
Deaths from Parkinson's disease